The 1905 VFL season was the ninth season of the Victorian Football League (VFL), the highest level senior Australian rules football competition in Victoria. The season featured eight clubs, ran from 6 May until 30 September, and comprised a 17-game home-and-away season followed by a finals series featuring the top four clubs.

The premiership was won by the Fitzroy Football Club for the fourth time and second time consecutively, after it defeated  by 13 points in the 1905 VFL Grand Final.

Premiership season
In 1905, the VFL competition consisted of eight teams of 18 on-the-field players each, with no "reserves", although any of the 18 players who had left the playing field for any reason could later resume their place on the field at any time during the match.

Each team played each other twice in a home-and-away season of 14 rounds. Then, based on ladder positions after those 14 rounds, three further 'sectional rounds' were played, with the teams ranked 1st, 3rd, 5th and 7th playing in one section and the teams ranked 2nd, 4th, 6th and 8th playing in the other. 

Once the 14 round home-and-away season had finished, the 1905 VFL Premiers were determined by the specific format and conventions of the amended "Argus system".

Round 1

|- bgcolor="#CCCCFF"
| Home team
| Home team score
| Away team
| Away team score
| Venue
| Date
|- bgcolor="#FFFFFF"
| 
| 9.8 (62)
| 
| 6.10 (46)
| MCG
| 6 May 1905
|- bgcolor="#FFFFFF"
| 
| 5.9 (39)
| 
| 8.14 (62)
| Corio Oval
| 6 May 1905
|- bgcolor="#FFFFFF"
| 
| 8.12 (60)
| 
| 7.10 (52)
| Princes Park
| 6 May 1905
|- bgcolor="#FFFFFF"
| 
| 4.10 (34)
| 
| 3.13 (31)
| Brunswick Street Oval
| 6 May 1905

Round 2

|- bgcolor="#CCCCFF"
| Home team
| Home team score
| Away team
| Away team score
| Venue
| Date
|- bgcolor="#FFFFFF"
| 
| 12.10 (82)
| 
| 7.6 (48)
| EMCG
| 13 May 1905
|- bgcolor="#FFFFFF"
| 
| 11.7 (73)
| 
| 10.7 (67)
| Lake Oval
| 13 May 1905
|- bgcolor="#FFFFFF"
| 
| 4.9 (33)
| 
| 9.10 (64)
| Junction Oval
| 13 May 1905
|- bgcolor="#FFFFFF"
| 
| 10.10 (70)
| 
| 4.14 (38)
| Victoria Park
| 13 May 1905

Round 3

|- bgcolor="#CCCCFF"
| Home team
| Home team score
| Away team
| Away team score
| Venue
| Date
|- bgcolor="#FFFFFF"
| 
| 10.16 (76)
| 
| 4.11 (35)
| Brunswick Street Oval
| 20 May 1905
|- bgcolor="#FFFFFF"
| 
| 8.14 (62)
| 
| 5.9 (39)
| MCG
| 20 May 1905
|- bgcolor="#FFFFFF"
| 
| 10.10 (70)
| 
| 18.10 (118)
| Junction Oval
| 20 May 1905
|- bgcolor="#FFFFFF"
| 
| 5.15 (45)
| 
| 7.13 (55)
| Lake Oval
| 20 May 1905

Round 4

|- bgcolor="#CCCCFF"
| Home team
| Home team score
| Away team
| Away team score
| Venue
| Date
|- bgcolor="#FFFFFF"
| 
| 5.13 (43)
| 
| 7.4 (46)
| Corio Oval
| 27 May 1905
|- bgcolor="#FFFFFF"
| 
| 14.11 (95)
| 
| 5.9 (39)
| EMCG
| 27 May 1905
|- bgcolor="#FFFFFF"
| 
| 5.16 (46)
| 
| 4.7 (31)
| Victoria Park
| 27 May 1905
|- bgcolor="#FFFFFF"
| 
| 5.7 (37)
| 
| 10.13 (73)
| Princes Park
| 27 May 1905

Round 5

|- bgcolor="#CCCCFF"
| Home team
| Home team score
| Away team
| Away team score
| Venue
| Date
|- bgcolor="#FFFFFF"
| 
| 12.9 (81)
| 
| 2.10 (22)
| Victoria Park
| 3 June 1905
|- bgcolor="#FFFFFF"
| 
| 3.12 (30)
| 
| 5.8 (38)
| MCG
| 3 June 1905
|- bgcolor="#FFFFFF"
| 
| 5.10 (40)
| 
| 4.4 (28)
| Princes Park
| 5 June 1905
|- bgcolor="#FFFFFF"
| 
| 5.9 (39)
| 
| 7.12 (54)
| Junction Oval
| 5 June 1905

Round 6

|- bgcolor="#CCCCFF"
| Home team
| Home team score
| Away team
| Away team score
| Venue
| Date
|- bgcolor="#FFFFFF"
| 
| 6.11 (47)
| 
| 3.6 (24)
| Lake Oval
| 10 June 1905
|- bgcolor="#FFFFFF"
| 
| 5.5 (35)
| 
| 3.10 (28)
| Brunswick Street Oval
| 10 June 1905
|- bgcolor="#FFFFFF"
| 
| 4.3 (27)
| 
| 6.10 (46)
| Corio Oval
| 10 June 1905
|- bgcolor="#FFFFFF"
| 
| 5.8 (38)
| 
| 6.5 (41)
| MCG
| 10 June 1905

Round 7

|- bgcolor="#CCCCFF"
| Home team
| Home team score
| Away team
| Away team score
| Venue
| Date
|- bgcolor="#FFFFFF"
| 
| 7.14 (56)
| 
| 7.12 (54)
| Corio Oval
| 17 June 1905
|- bgcolor="#FFFFFF"
| 
| 9.14 (68)
| 
| 6.6 (42)
| Brunswick Street Oval
| 17 June 1905
|- bgcolor="#FFFFFF"
| 
| 6.7 (43)
| 
| 10.12 (72)
| EMCG
| 17 June 1905
|- bgcolor="#FFFFFF"
| 
| 3.7 (25)
| 
| 8.15 (63)
| Junction Oval
| 17 June 1905

Round 8

|- bgcolor="#CCCCFF"
| Home team
| Home team score
| Away team
| Away team score
| Venue
| Date
|- bgcolor="#FFFFFF"
| 
| 5.11 (41)
| 
| 3.1 (19)
| Victoria Park
| 1 July 1905
|- bgcolor="#FFFFFF"
| 
| 8.6 (54)
| 
| 7.9 (51)
| Junction Oval
| 1 July 1905
|- bgcolor="#FFFFFF"
| 
| 4.5 (29)
| 
| 6.7 (43)
| Lake Oval
| 1 July 1905
|- bgcolor="#FFFFFF"
| 
| 7.20 (62)
| 
| 8.12 (60)
| EMCG
| 1 July 1905

Round 9

|- bgcolor="#CCCCFF"
| Home team
| Home team score
| Away team
| Away team score
| Venue
| Date
|- bgcolor="#FFFFFF"
| 
| 3.8 (26)
| 
| 8.10 (58)
| MCG
| 8 July 1905
|- bgcolor="#FFFFFF"
| 
| 14.7 (91)
| 
| 6.4 (40)
| Brunswick Street Oval
| 8 July 1905
|- bgcolor="#FFFFFF"
| 
| 6.8 (44)
| 
| 8.11 (59)
| Princes Park
| 8 July 1905
|- bgcolor="#FFFFFF"
| 
| 9.8 (62)
| 
| 6.12 (48)
| Corio Oval
| 8 July 1905

Round 10

|- bgcolor="#CCCCFF"
| Home team
| Home team score
| Away team
| Away team score
| Venue
| Date
|- bgcolor="#FFFFFF"
| 
| 8.17 (65)
| 
| 5.11 (41)
| EMCG
| 15 July 1905
|- bgcolor="#FFFFFF"
| 
| 13.19 (97)
| 
| 3.9 (27)
| Victoria Park
| 15 July 1905
|- bgcolor="#FFFFFF"
| 
| 7.16 (58)
| 
| 8.13 (61)
| Princes Park
| 15 July 1905
|- bgcolor="#FFFFFF"
| 
| 9.8 (62)
| 
| 2.15 (27)
| Corio Oval
| 15 July 1905

Round 11

|- bgcolor="#CCCCFF"
| Home team
| Home team score
| Away team
| Away team score
| Venue
| Date
|- bgcolor="#FFFFFF"
| 
| 3.5 (23)
| 
| 6.12 (48)
| Junction Oval
| 22 July 1905
|- bgcolor="#FFFFFF"
| 
| 7.8 (50)
| 
| 6.13 (49)
| Lake Oval
| 22 July 1905
|- bgcolor="#FFFFFF"
| 
| 6.5 (41)
| 
| 9.20 (74)
| MCG
| 22 July 1905
|- bgcolor="#FFFFFF"
| 
| 5.9 (39)
| 
| 6.5 (41)
| Brunswick Street Oval
| 22 July 1905

Round 12

|- bgcolor="#CCCCFF"
| Home team
| Home team score
| Away team
| Away team score
| Venue
| Date
|- bgcolor="#FFFFFF"
| 
| 5.7 (37)
| 
| 2.6 (18)
| Brunswick Street Oval
| 29 July 1905
|- bgcolor="#FFFFFF"
| 
| 9.16 (70)
| 
| 3.9 (27)
| EMCG
| 29 July 1905
|- bgcolor="#FFFFFF"
| 
| 3.3 (21)
| 
| 4.5 (29)
| Lake Oval
| 29 July 1905
|- bgcolor="#FFFFFF"
| 
| 6.5 (41)
| 
| 6.11 (47)
| Corio Oval
| 29 July 1905

Round 13

|- bgcolor="#CCCCFF"
| Home team
| Home team score
| Away team
| Away team score
| Venue
| Date
|- bgcolor="#FFFFFF"
| 
| 5.11 (41)
| 
| 5.9 (39)
| Junction Oval
| 5 August 1905
|- bgcolor="#FFFFFF"
| 
| 3.11 (29)
| 
| 5.12 (42)
| EMCG
| 5 August 1905
|- bgcolor="#FFFFFF"
| 
| 7.8 (50)
| 
| 4.12 (36)
| Victoria Park
| 5 August 1905
|- bgcolor="#FFFFFF"
| 
| 12.10 (82)
| 
| 2.8 (20)
| Princes Park
| 5 August 1905

Round 14

|- bgcolor="#CCCCFF"
| Home team
| Home team score
| Away team
| Away team score
| Venue
| Date
|- bgcolor="#FFFFFF"
| 
| 7.11 (53)
| 
| 10.6 (66)
| Victoria Park
| 19 August 1905
|- bgcolor="#FFFFFF"
| 
| 9.19 (73)
| 
| 3.5 (23)
| Princes Park
| 19 August 1905
|- bgcolor="#FFFFFF"
| 
| 13.12 (90)
| 
| 7.13 (55)
| MCG
| 19 August 1905
|- bgcolor="#FFFFFF"
| 
| 7.8 (50)
| 
| 7.8 (50)
| Lake Oval
| 19 August 1905

Sectional Rounds

Sectional Round 1 (Round 15)

|- bgcolor="#CCCCFF"
| Home team
| Home team score
| Away team
| Away team score
| Venue
| Date
|- bgcolor="#FFFFFF"
| 
| 9.12 (66)
| 
| 6.13 (49)
| Victoria Park
| 26 August 1905
|- bgcolor="#FFFFFF"
| 
| 10.13 (73)
| 
| 3.11 (29)
| EMCG
| 26 August 1905
|- bgcolor="#FFFFFF"
| 
| 6.9 (45)
| 
| 4.7 (31)
| Brunswick Street Oval
| 26 August 1905
|- bgcolor="#FFFFFF"
| 
| 13.11 (89)
| 
| 5.10 (40)
| Lake Oval
| 26 August 1905

Sectional Round 2 (Round 16)

|- bgcolor="#CCCCFF"
| Home team
| Home team score
| Away team
| Away team score
| Venue
| Date
|- bgcolor="#FFFFFF"
| 
| 12.20 (92)
| 
| 7.7 (49)
| Princes Park
| 2 September 1905
|- bgcolor="#FFFFFF"
| 
| 3.9 (27)
| 
| 7.18 (60)
| MCG
| 2 September 1905
|- bgcolor="#FFFFFF"
| 
| 8.6 (54)
| 
| 12.12 (84)
| Junction Oval
| 2 September 1905
|- bgcolor="#FFFFFF"
| 
| 10.8 (68)
| 
| 9.12 (66)
| Corio Oval
| 2 September 1905

Sectional Round 3 (Round 17)

|- bgcolor="#CCCCFF"
| Home team
| Home team score
| Away team
| Away team score
| Venue
| Date
|- bgcolor="#FFFFFF"
| 
| 5.8 (38)
| 
| 18.17 (125)
| MCG
| 9 September 1905
|- bgcolor="#FFFFFF"
| 
| 17.16 (118)
| 
| 5.10 (40)
| Victoria Park
| 9 September 1905
|- bgcolor="#FFFFFF"
| 
| 4.13 (37)
| 
| 11.14 (80)
| EMCG
| 9 September 1905
|- bgcolor="#FFFFFF"
| 
| 12.15 (87)
| 
| 3.9 (27)
| Junction Oval
| 9 September 1905

Ladder

Semi finals

First Semi Final

|- bgcolor="#CCCCFF"
| Home team
| Home team score
| Away team
| Away team score
| Venue
| Date
| Attendance
|- bgcolor="#FFFFFF"
| 
| 12.7 (79)
| 
| 4.12 (36)
| Princes Park
| 16 September 1905
| 14,000
|- bgcolor="#FFFFFF"

Second Semi Final

|- bgcolor="#CCCCFF"
| Home team
| Home team score
| Away team
| Away team score
| Venue
| Date
| Attendance
|- bgcolor="#FFFFFF"
| 
| 4.6 (30)
| 
| 11.10 (76)
| MCG
| 16 September 1905
| 14,000
|- bgcolor="#FFFFFF"

Preliminary final

|- bgcolor="#CCCCFF"
| Home team
| Home team score
| Away team
| Away team score
| Venue
| Date
| Attendance
|- bgcolor="#FFFFFF"
| 
| 11.6 (72)
| 
| 6.9 (45)
| MCG
| 23 September 1905
| 30,000
|- bgcolor="#FFFFFF"

Grand final

Fitzroy defeated Collingwood 4.6 (30) to 2.5 (17). (For an explanation of scoring see Australian rules football).

Awards
 The 1905 VFL Premiership team was Fitzroy.
 The VFL's leading goalkicker was Charlie Pannam of Collingwood with 38 goals.
 Melbourne took the "wooden spoon" in 1905.

Notable events
 Collingwood used only 24 players to play its nineteen games – the smallest number of players to represent one club in a VFL/AFL season.
 Australasian Football Council formed.
 VFL decides to pay field umpires 30 shillings per match, and boundary umpires 7 shillings per match (approx $75.00 and $20.00 in 2008 buying power).

References

 Maplestone, M., Flying Higher: History of the Essendon Football Club 1872–1996, Essendon Football Club, (Melbourne), 1996. 
 Rogers, S. & Brown, A., Every Game Ever Played: VFL/AFL Results 1897–1997 (Sixth Edition), Viking Books, (Ringwood), 1998. 
 Ross, J. (ed), 100 Years of Australian Football 1897–1996: The Complete Story of the AFL, All the Big Stories, All the Great Pictures, All the Champions, Every AFL Season Reported, Viking, (Ringwood), 1996.

External links
 1905 Season - AFL Tables

Australian Football League seasons